Frej Liewendahl (22 October 1902 – 31 January 1966) was a Finnish track and field athlete. He was born in Åland. He competed in the 3000 metres team race at the 1924 Summer Olympics, where the Finnish team won gold medals. He also competed in the 1,500 metre, where he placed eighth. He died in Mariehamn, aged 63.

References

External links

1902 births
1966 deaths
People from Jomala
People from Turku and Pori Province (Grand Duchy of Finland)
Finnish male middle-distance runners
Olympic athletes of Finland
Olympic gold medalists for Finland
Athletes (track and field) at the 1924 Summer Olympics
Olympic gold medalists in athletics (track and field)
Medalists at the 1924 Summer Olympics
Sportspeople from Åland